Šilutė District Municipality is one of 60 municipalities in Lithuania. It is known for spring floods when ice on Nemunas River starts melting. This is the only municipality in Lithuania that gets flooded on regular basis.

Unemployment rate in the municipality dropped from 10.9% in January 2003 to 7.7% in January 2005. However, the national rate remains 1.2-1.7% lower.

Geography
Total area of Šilutė District Municipality is 1706 km². Forests cover 340 km² or almost 20%, waters (most notably Nemunas Delta) - 348 km² or 20.4%, arable land - 611 km² or 35.8%, pastures and grasslands - 226 km² or 13.2%, buildings and roads - 60 km² or 3.5% of the territory.

Šilutė municipality includes the biggest part of Lithuania Minor in present-day Lithuania, with some Lietuvninkai' heritage. There are areas of unique nature in the district, dominated by lowland pastures. The picturesque Nemunas Delta and Ventė Cape is home to many local and migrating birds. Rusnė, a settlement located in the Nemunas Delta, is the only island town in Lithuania; some part of it situated below the sea level.

There are 318 villages with 33,800 residents in the municipality. During the 2001 census, 12 villages had no residents. About 14,000 of the municipality residents are children younger than 15 year old and about 10,000 are elderly.

Coat of arms
The coat of arms was designed in 1968. It depicts a white sailing ship. On top there is a traditional weathercock (Lithuanian: vėtrungė) used by local fishermen. At the bottom there is a horn, an old symbol of postal services. These symbols hint to the Curonian Lagoon, traditional fishing business, and Šilutė as the old sea port. For a while Šilutė was along an important postal route.

People 
 Hermann Sudermann (1857-1928), dramatist and novelist

References

International relations

Šilutė district municipality maintains sister city relationships with the following cities:

  Ljungby, Sweden
  Emmerich, Germany
  Ostróda, Poland
  Slavsk, Russia
  Gdańsk, Poland
  Saldus, Latvia
  Cittaducale, Italy
  Vellinge, Sweden
  Alanya, Turkey

Municipalities of Klaipėda County
Lithuania Minor
Municipalities of Lithuania